Christian Solidarity International (CSI) is a Christian human rights NGO that is "committed to defending religious liberty, helping victims of religious repression, victimized children, and victims of disaster."  It is based in Switzerland, with affiliates in the United States, Czech Republic, France, Germany, Hungary, Italy, South Korea, and the Netherlands.

In 1995, Steve Snyder, former president of the USA Division of Christian Solidarity International, founded International Christian Concern, a non-denominational Christian human rights non-governmental organization watchdog group.

In 2009 the Washington, D.C. based group published a study of the abduction and forced marriage of young Christian Coptic girls by Muslim families. CSI is known for its campaign to liberate Sudanese slaves seized during Sudan's second civil war.  They have also been active in Egypt, Iraq, the disputed territory of Nagorno-Karabakh, Latin America, and other countries and regions.

Work

South Sudan 
CSI runs several programs in South Sudan to aid victims of the second Sudanese civil war (1983–2005).  In particular, CSI works to free southerners who were enslaved by northern Arab raiders during the war.  CSI partners with a network of local Arab and southern Sudanese tribal leaders who work to retrieve enslaved southerners from the north.  CSI provides funding and logistical support for these retrievals, and documents the name and story of each returning slave.  CSI also provides returning slaves with survival kits containing food, cooking utensils, mosquito nets and other supplies.  CSI claims that some 80,000 enslaved southerners have returned to their homes through this network.  CSI is the only NGO working to free southern Sudanese slaves held in the north.

CSI also operates a clinic and employs a full-time South Sudanese physician in Wanjok, South Sudan, to provide medical care for returning slaves and other locals.  CSI regularly leads expeditions to South Sudan for journalists and lawmakers, to highlight the persistence of slavery in Sudan and the need for greater international engagement.

Iraq 
CSI supplies Iraqi Christians displaced by anti-Christian violence with material aid, including food, kerosene heaters and medical aid.  CSI has also been active in documenting acts of violence against Iraqi Christians and in lobbying the U.S. government and Iraqi government to do more to protect Iraq's Christian minority.

Egypt 
In 2009, CSI commissioned and published a study on the abduction and forced marriage of young Egyptian Coptic Christian women by Egyptian Muslims.  The study was authored by George Washington University Professor Michelle Clark, who traveled to Egypt to investigate the issue with the Egyptian Coptic human rights activist Nadia Ghaly.  Clark later testified before Congress on the issue.   CSI's advocacy on behalf of Egyptian Copts is ongoing.

Advocacy 
CSI actively lobbies the U.S. government and U.S. Congress to take greater action on human rights and religious freedom issues.  CSI's activities include letter- and petition-writing, producing issue reports and providing expert testimony at congressional hearings.

History 
CSI was founded in 1977 in Switzerland by Reverend Hansjürg Stückelberger.  In its early years, the organization campaigned for the release of imprisoned Christians in Eastern Europe, China, and Latin America.

During the 1992–93 Armenia-Azerbaijan war, CSI broke Azerbaijan's blockade of the contested Nagorno-Karabakh territory numerous times to deliver humanitarian aid and document acts of violence against the Christian Armenian inhabitants of Nagorno-Karabakh.  CSI also partnered with the Andrei Sakharov foundation to send aid to Azeri-Turk refugees from Nagorno-Karabakh. Witnessing the war on the ground, CSI published a detailed account of the first Nagorno-Karabakh War titled "Ethnic Cleansing in Progress: War in Nagorno Karabakh" co-authored by John Eibner and Baroness Caroline Cox.

CSI's involvement with Sudan began in 1992, when two of CSI's leaders, Dr. John Eibner and Baroness Caroline Cox, traveled to southern Sudan at the invitation of local churches to observe the effects of civil war on the Christian populations there.  CSI began to document and publicize massacres and slave raids carried out by the Arab-led central government and its tribal allies against the largely Christian, traditionalist peoples of southern Sudan.  CSI was the first advocacy group on the ground in Sudan.  CSI became especially involved in the slavery issue in 1995, when, at the request of Arab and Dinka tribal leaders in Sudan, CSI began providing funding and logistical support for a "retrieval network" set up by Sudanese tribes with a common interest in peace.  This network, which Eibner has described as a "new underground railroad,"   was designed to redeem enslaved southerners out of slavery and return them to their homes in the south.  CSI's participation in this slave liberation effort continues to this day.

In the 1990s, several groups broke away from the central CSI organization and became independent NGOs.  These splinter groups include International Christian Concern, founded by Steve Snyder in 1995, Christian Solidarity Worldwide, founded by Baroness Caroline Cox in 1997, and Christian Freedom International, founded by Jim Jacobson in 1998.

In 1999, at the request of the Government of Sudan, the United Nations revoked CSI's status as a consultative NGO after it allowed the southern Sudanese leader John Garang to represent it before the Commission on Human Rights.  The New York Times' A. M. Rosenthal described the revocation as a "piece of nastiness" that amounted to "permitting a slave-taking nation to stifle an organization that struggles for slave-freeing. "

In response to the Darfur genocide, CSI helped to launch the "Sudan Campaign" in the summer of 2004, along with Freedom House, the Institute for Religion and Democracy, and number of left-wing activists.  The Sudan Campaign led an effort to get multinational corporations and pension funds to divest from Sudan, and staged a civil disobedience program which involved a number of prominent civil rights leaders and human rights activists being arrested at the Sudanese embassy in Washington DC.

In November 2011, after a wave of violence against Christians in the Middle East following the Arab Spring revolutions, CSI issued a Genocide Warning for Christians and other non-Muslim minorities in the Middle East.  CSI called on President Obama to dedicate at least 15% of funds pledged for aiding the region's democratic transition to "combating Islamic supremacism," to withhold funding from Middle East institutions that discriminate against minorities, and to appeal to the UN Secretary General to issue a Genocide Warning.  CSI also launched a petition campaign to President Obama on its website.

Principles 
According to the organization's website, CSI's guiding principle is "respect for the God-given right of every human being to choose his or her faith and to practice it." The organization appeals to Article 18 of the United Nations' Universal Declaration of Human Rights, which states in part:

Everyone has the right to freedom of thought, conscience and religion; this right includes freedom to change his religion or belief, and freedom, either alone or in community with others and in :public or private, to manifest his religion or belief in teaching, practice, worship and observance.

CSI also cites biblical exhortations to "seek justice," "defend the oppressed," and "proclaim liberty to the captives" as guiding principles.

Criticisms 
CSI's participation in slave liberation efforts in Sudan has received criticism.  In 1999, UNICEF called the practice "intolerable," claiming that it was not a "lasting solution" to the slavery problem and faulting it for implicitly accepting that human beings can be purchased.  UNICEF also claimed that paying money for slaves provided combatants in the war with cash for buying weapons. Human Rights Watch stated that buying back slaves might provide a "monetary incentive" for further slave raiding and warned of the "risk of fraud in the redemption process. "  In 2002, a United States State Department report on the issue declared, "As a matter of principle, no person holding another who has been abducted or enslaved should be paid to secure that person's release. ...we believe that some legitimate concerns about this practice have been raised." Other critics agree that the campaign "encourages the taking of slaves"  and "reduces the incentive for owners to set them free without payment" (The New York Times), or "undercuts" the "battle against slavery" (Richard Miniter for The Atlantic).

CSI responded to UNICEF's 1999 critique by claiming that it never brought American dollars into the warzone, and redeemed slaves only with Sudanese pounds to decrease the potential for fueling the arms trade.  Today, CSI claims to use only cattle vaccine in its exchanges. On its website, CSI defends the morality of paying for the release of slaves "when there is no better way to affect liberation, and when the families of the enslaved and the leaders of the victimized community desire it."  CSI argues that slavery in Sudan is "not driven mainly by economic forces," but by "political and military factors. The suspension of slave raiding in Southern Sudan at the time of the signing of the Comprehensive Peace Agreement ... clearly proves this fact."  CSI claims that it "has employed many safeguards to prevent against fraud," including "independent investigations," and involving "many people, representing different segments of the victimized communities ... in the documentation process." It adds, "None of the few outsiders who have claimed that not all the slaves are genuine have ever produced the name or other details of a false slave. Such allegations remain today unsubstantiated. "

In 2008, journalist Charles Sennott wrote that CSI was "overreacting to events in the Middle East" in its campaign to save Iraqi Christians.

See also

 Anti-Christian sentiment
 International Christian Concern, a Christian human rights NGO
 Persecution of Christians
 Religious intolerance
 Religious persecution
 Slavery in Sudan
 Second Sudanese Civil War

References

External links 
 Official site

International human rights organizations
Religious organisations based in Switzerland
Persecution of Christians
Christian organizations established in the 20th century
Abolitionist organizations
Organizations that combat human trafficking
Contemporary slavery